Afghanistan competed at the 2008 Asian Beach Games held in Bali, Indonesia from October 18, 2008, to October 26, 2008. Afghanistan finished with 1 gold medal and 1 bronze medal.  Both medals were won in the sport of beach wrestling

Nations at the 2008 Asian Beach Games
2008
Asian Beach Games